We Four Girls Are Here to Stay! is a VHS released by B*Witched in 1999. It contained their Disney Channel In Concert performance as well as all four full music videos for the singles released from their debut album. The album name comes from the song "We Four Girls", which is included on their debut album, in which Edele scream-sings "We four girls are here to stay!"

Track listing
 We Four Girls Are Here to Stay! [EV 50201]
Music videos:
"C'est la Vie"
"To You I Belong"
"Blame It on the Weatherman"
"Rollercoaster" (UK video)
"Rollercoaster" (US video)

Disney Channel "In Concert" Series Special:
"Let's Go – The B*Witched Jig" (live)
"Rollercoaster" (live)
"Rev It Up" (live)
"To You I Belong" (live)
"We Four Girls" (live)
"Blame It on the Weatherman" (live)
"C'est la Vie" (live)

References

B*Witched video albums